John Hopkins Clarke (April 1, 1789November 23, 1870) was a United States senator from Rhode Island. Born in Elizabeth, New Jersey, he moved to Providence where he studied under a private teacher. He graduated from Brown University in 1809, studied law, was admitted to the bar and commenced practice in Providence in 1812. He was clerk of the supreme court of Providence County in 1813 and proprietor of a distillery in Cranston until 1824 when he became a cotton manufacturer in Providence, Pontiac, and Woonsocket. He was a member of the Rhode Island House of Representatives from 1836 to 1842 and from 1845 to 1847.

Clarke was elected as a Whig to the US Senate and served from March 4, 1847, to March 3, 1853; he resumed his former manufacturing pursuits and died in Providence in 1870. Interment was in the North Burial Ground.

References

External links

1789 births
1870 deaths
Brown University alumni
United States senators from Rhode Island
Members of the Rhode Island House of Representatives
Rhode Island lawyers
Rhode Island Whigs
19th-century American politicians
Whig Party United States senators
Burials at North Burying Ground (Providence)
19th-century American lawyers